Ahmad Shirzad is an Iranian physicist. He was a member of 6th Iran Parliament (Consultative Assembly of Iran). He also was a member of Islamic Iran Participation Front and an active iranian politician between 1995-2010.

Shirzad is a faculty member of physics department at Isfahan University of Technology. He teaches Analytical Mechanics and Quantum Mechanics. His research field includes High Energy Physics and Mathematical Physics.

References

External links
 Ahmad Shirzad's personal website and weblog

Members of the 6th Islamic Consultative Assembly
Islamic Iran Participation Front politicians
Living people
Academic staff of Isfahan University of Technology
1958 births
Iranian physicists